Camille Le Tellier de Louvois (11 April 1675 – 5 November 1718) was a French clergyman and member of several royal academies in the reign of Louis XIV of France. He was the fourth member elected to occupy seat 4 of the Académie française in 1706.

He was born in Paris, the fourth son of François Michel Le Tellier de Louvois. He received a doctorate from the Sorbonne at the age of 25. He served as curator of the cabinet des médailles, that is of coins and medals, at the royal library at the Louvre. He was a member of the Academy of Sciences, of the Académie des Inscriptions et Belles-Lettres and, from 1706, of the Académie française where he replaced Jean Testu de Mauroy.

References

Luc-Normand Tellier, Face aux Colbert : les Le Tellier, Vauban, Turgot ... et l'avènement du libéralisme, Presses de l'Université du Québec, 1987, 816 pages.Etext

1675 births
1718 deaths
Clergy from Paris
Members of the Académie des Inscriptions et Belles-Lettres
Members of the Académie Française
Members of the French Academy of Sciences
University of Paris alumni